Edward R. Richards-Orpen (1884 – November 1967) was an Irish independent politician and furniture maker. He was a member of Seanad Éireann from 1948 to 1951. He was nominated by the Taoiseach to the 6th Seanad in 1948. He did not contest the 1951 Seanad election.

Early life and background 
Edward R Richards Orpen was born in 1884 to the family of Adela and Goddard Henry Orpen of Monksgrange, a renowned historian of the Anglo-Norman period of Irish history. He was also related to Irish portrait painter, William Orpen and was married to Margaret. In late 1916, at the age of 32, Edward joined Army Services Corps. popularly known as ASC that undertook the vital but life-threatening work of food and weapon supply to the soldiers at the front. Because of his dedicated work, discipline and leadership qualities, Edward got quick promotions. After few months of joining, precisely in early 1917, he had been promoted to second lieutenant position followed by the post of acting captain.

References

1884 births
1967 deaths
Independent members of Seanad Éireann
Members of the 6th Seanad
Nominated members of Seanad Éireann